Arelaune-en-Seine is a commune in the department of Seine-Maritime, northern France. The municipality was established on 1 January 2016 by merger of the former communes of La Mailleraye-sur-Seine and Saint-Nicolas-de-Bliquetuit.

Population

See also 
Communes of the Seine-Maritime department

References 

Communes of Seine-Maritime
Populated places established in 2016
2016 establishments in France